Nervous System is the third extended play and major-label debut by American singer and songwriter Julia Michaels, released by Republic Records on July 28, 2017. Most of the tracks on the EP were composed by Michaels and her frequent writing partner, Justin Tranter, as well as the songs producers, Benny Blanco, Stargate and Mattman & Robin. Musically, it is a pop record and lyrically it explores a former romantic relationship of Michaels'. It is Michaels' first EP to have a commercial impact.

The album's first single, "Issues", was released on January 13, 2017, and peaked at number 11 on the Billboard Hot 100. "Uh Huh", the second single from Nervous System, was released on June 2, 2017. "Worst in Me", the third single from the EP, was released on September 18, 2017.

Background and recording 
From 2013 to 2016, Julia Michaels became well known for writing songs for Selena Gomez, Justin Bieber, Demi Lovato, Britney Spears, Gwen Stefani and several other artists. When she wrote and recorded the song "Issues" in January 2016, after a fight with her boyfriend, she showed the song to Charlie Walk. Two months later, he signed her a record contract with Republic Records. She had no idea that "Issues" would be a hit, so she decided to record the rest of her EP in April and May 2017. She said to Music Choice:

"I did a mini-album because this is all very new to me, and I didn't wanna do an EP because I feel like that's too little. I feel like that's a chapter and I feel like an album is the book, and I'm not ready for the book".

All the tracks of the EP are brand new songs, Michaels did not bring any rejected songs from other artists or old songs that she wrote. Michaels composed most of the songs with her writing partner Justin Tranter and Stargate, Mattman & Robin and Benny Blanco produced and helped write the songs.

Songs and lyrical content
The record opens with the singer's lead single "Issues", a midtempo song talks about a relationship between people who have "issues", but love each other enough to work past them. The second single of the EP, "Uh Huh", is described by Mike Wass of Idolator as "brighter, bolder and more instant" than "Issues", as well labeling the chorus as "obscenely catchy". In "Worst in Me" Michaels discusses a troubled relationship. Variety opined that the relationship described in the song is similar to the one in "Issues", but that in "Worst in Me", Michaels is "less hopeful about how it'll turn out".

"Make It Up to You" is an uptempo dance-pop track that talks about Michaels' "wickedness" toward her lover, but in the end, she feels sorry for him. The fifth track on the record, "Just Do It" is a midtempo song that starts with a simple bass melody before incorporating elements such as synthesizers, percussion elements and guitars. "Pink" is described by Michaels as "the most twerky song of the album" and "very explanatory". The last track, "Don't Wanna Think", is the only song on the record written entirely by Michaels and is a piano ballad that follows a basic sequence of F–C–Am–F as its chord progression.

Critical reception

Katherine St. Asaph, writing for Pitchfork, rated the EP 6.6 out of 10, writing that "the songs are refreshingly unique but their impact is varied." She complimented Michaels' "modest persona and writing style she likens to therapy." Chris Willman of Variety wrote that the EP "reveals Michaels as a gifted enough singer and confession-inclined enough songwriter that leaving out the middleman was definitely the way to go." Willman called the EP "even more promising than her resume." Neil Z. Yeung of AllMusic called the EP a "seven-song set of forward-thinking pop."

Track listing

Personnel
Credits adapted from the liner notes of Nervous System.

Recorded, engineered, mixed and mastered at

 Los Angeles, California 
 Suffolk, United Kingdom 
 New York City 
 Partille, Sweden 
 Stockholm, Sweden 

Performers and production

 Julia Michaels – vocals ; background vocals ; production, piano 
 Benny Blanco – production, instrumentation, programming 
 Stargate – production, instrumentation, programming 
 Justin Tranter – background vocals 
 Dave Schwerkolt – engineering 
 Chris Sclafani  – engineering 
 Spike Stent – mixing 
 Michael Freeman – assistant engineer mix 
 Geoff Swish – assistant engineer mix 
 Tom Coyne – mastering 
 Randy Merrill – mastering 
 Mattman & Robin – production, programming, drums, bass, synths ; percussion, claps ; piano ; toms ; guitar ; strings 
 Sam Holland – engineering 
 Cory Bice – engineering 
 Jeremy Lertola – assistant engineering 
 Jon Sher – engineering 
 Mattias Bylund – strings recording, strings editing, string arrangement, strings 
 Mattias Johansson – violin 
 Jungen B. Linderholm – cello 
 Benjamin Rice – recording

Charts

References

2017 EPs
Albums produced by Benny Blanco
Albums produced by Mattman & Robin
Albums produced by Stargate
Julia Michaels albums
Republic Records EPs